Choristellidae is a family of gastropods in the superfamily Seguenzioidea (according to the taxonomy of the Gastropoda (Bouchet & Rocroi, 2017)

Genera 
Genera in the family Choristellidae include:
 Bichoristes McLean, 1992
 Choristella Bush, 1897

References 

 Bouchet P., Rocroi J.P., Hausdorf B., Kaim A., Kano Y., Nützel A., Parkhaev P., Schrödl M. & Strong E.E. (2017). Revised classification, nomenclator and typification of gastropod and monoplacophoran families. Malacologia. 61(1-2): 1-526
 Haszprunar G. 1992. On the anatomy and relationships of the Choristellidae (Archaeogastropoda: Lepetelloidea). The Veliger 35(4): 295–307

External links
 McLean J.H. (1992). Systematic review of the family Choristellidae (Archeogastropoda: Lepetellacea) with descriptions of new species. The Veliger 35(4): 273-294,